Anthomyia quinquemaculata is a species of anthomyiid fly belonging to the family Anthomyiidae.

This species is mainly present in Czech Republic, France, Italy, Greece, Spain, Portugal, in the Near East and in North Africa.

It has five distinct black spots on the thorax. The black spot at the base of the wing is in continuity with the dorsal-lateral one. Scutellum is gray only at the apex. Tibial setae are short, seta in the middle of the tibia 2 is as long as the diameter of the tibia itself. In the female the eyes are  well spaced.

References

 VERNER MICHELSEN - The Anthomyia pluvialis complex in Europe (Diptera, Anthomyiidae) - Systematic Entomology - Volume 5, Issue 3, pages 281–290, July 1980

External links
 Biolib
 Fauna Europaea

Anthomyiidae
Insects described in 1839
Brachyceran flies of Europe
Taxa named by Pierre-Justin-Marie Macquart